Rear-Admiral Henry Montagu Doughty,  (4 September 1870 – 1 May 1921) was an officer of the Royal Navy during the First World War.

Biography
Doughty was born in 1870, and joined the Royal Navy, where he was promoted to sub-lieutenant on 14 January 1890, and to lieutenant on 14 January 1892. He was on 22 July 1902 posted as first lieutenant and gunnery officer to the pre-dreadnought battleship HMS Jupiter, and remained in that post until 31 December 1902, when he was promoted to commander.

During the First World War he was successively in command of the monitor HMS Abercrombie, and of several battleships, including HMS Agincourt, HMS Ramillies, and HMS Royal Sovereign.

He was promoted to rear-admiral on 1 November 1919.

References

1870 births
1921 deaths
Royal Navy rear admirals
Royal Navy officers of World War I
Companions of the Order of the Bath